The Universidad del Valle de Atemajac (UNIVA, also known as University of the Valley of Atemajac) is a private Catholic university in Zapopan, Mexico. While international students are welcome, the language of instruction at UNIVA is Spanish. Ximena Navarrete, the winner of the Miss Universe 2010 competition, studied in this university.

References

External links

Universities and colleges in Jalisco